Ruthie Ann Miles (born April 21, 1983) is an American actress, best known for her roles in musical theatre and on television.

Off-Broadway, she has played Christmas Eve in Avenue Q and starred as Imelda Marcos in Here Lies Love, winning a Theatre World Award and a Lucille Lortel Award for the latter role. Miles performed the role of Lady Thiang in the 2015–2016 Lincoln Center production of The King and I on Broadway, for which she won the 2015 Tony Award for Best Featured Actress in a Musical. In 2016, she had a recurring television role on The Americans. She returned to Broadway as Frieda/Betty in the 2017 revival of Sunday in the Park with George. In 2018, after recovering from injuries from a car crash that killed her daughter and caused her to lose her unborn child, Miles returned to the stage, reprising her role in the West End production of The King and I.

Early life and education
Miles was born in Arizona and raised by her Korean mother, Esther Wong, a music teacher, first in Korea and, from 2nd grade, in Honolulu, Hawaii. "I had to work very quickly and very hard to break my accent," Miles has said. She attended Kaimuki High School, graduating in 2001, and then Southern Oregon University before earning her bachelor's degree at Palm Beach Atlantic University in 2005. She received a Master of Music in Vocal Performance with an emphasis on music theatre at New York University's Steinhardt School of Culture, Education, and Human Development.

Career
With the off-Broadway York Theatre, Miles appeared as Leah in Two by Two and Red Urchin in The Roar of the Greasepaint – The Smell of the Crowd. She played Christmas Eve and other characters in Avenue Q off-Broadway for two years beginning in 2011. For her starring role as Imelda Marcos in Here Lies Love, in 2013 off-Broadway at The Public Theatre, she won a Theatre World Award and a Lucille Lortel Award. Miles has appeared in national tours of Sweeney Todd (as Adolfo Pirelli) and Annie. She has played numerous roles in regional theatre and appeared as a doctor in the film I Am Michael.

Miles received positive reviews for her role as Lady Thiang in the 2015 Broadway revival of The King and I, with Ben Brantley of The New York Times writing that she "turns 'Something Wonderful' into an exquisite expression of romantic realism that could be the show's anthem." Another critic called her "the one featured performer in a play or musical, on or off-Broadway, who I thought was giving the best performance this season ... [her] Lady Thiang is more empathetic than in other productions I have seen. ... People who see this King and I will think about Lady Thiang. They will think about what she knows, what she feels." For this role, she won the Tony Award for Best Featured Actress in a Musical and the Outer Critics Circle Award for Outstanding Featured Actress in a Musical.

In 2016, Miles appeared in a recurring role in the television series The Americans, playing Young-Hee Seong, a Korean immigrant and Mary Kay consultant whose husband is of interest to the KGB. She returned to Broadway in 2017 as Frieda/Betty in the revival of Sunday in the Park with George. In February 2018, Miles played Svetlana in a Kennedy Center concert production of the musical Chess. In August 2018, Miles joined the West End production of The King and I, reprising her Broadway role.

Since 2019, Miles has played the featured role of Sherri Kansky in the television series All Rise. She is set to return to Broadway in February 2023 as the Beggar Woman in Sweeney Todd.

Personal life
She is married to Jonathan Blumenstein. On March 5, 2018, Miles was injured, and the couple's five-year-old daughter Abigail Blumenstein was killed, while crossing a street in Brooklyn, New York, after they and other pedestrians were struck by a car that was driven through a red light. Miles was 7 months pregnant with her second child at the time of the incident. On May 11, 2018, Miles and Blumenstein lost their unborn child. Miles returned to the stage in August 2018. She gave birth to a daughter in April 2020 named Hope Elizabeth.

Work

Theatre

Film

Television

Awards and nominations

References

External links
 
 
 

1983 births
American musical theatre actresses
American mezzo-sopranos
Actresses from Arizona
Living people
New York University alumni
Singers from Arizona
Tony Award winners
21st-century American actresses
21st-century American singers
21st-century American women singers
American actresses of Korean descent
Actresses from Honolulu
Palm Beach Atlantic University alumni
Theatre World Award winners